The 2017 Africa U-17 Cup of Nations, officially known as the Total U-17 Africa Cup Of Nations, Gabon 2017, was the 12th edition of the Africa U-17 Cup of Nations (17th edition if tournaments without hosts are included), the biennial international youth football tournament organized by the Confederation of African Football (CAF) for players aged 17 and below.

The top four teams qualified for the 2017 FIFA U-17 World Cup in India.

Host selection
The tournament was originally set to take place in Madagascar between 2–16 April 2017. However, the CAF Executive Committee decided on 12 January 2017 to withdraw the hosting rights from Madagascar following the reports of the CAF inspection teams.

On 3 February 2017, Gabon were selected as the new hosts, and the tournament will now be played from 14 to 28 May 2017 (originally from 21 May to 4 June 2017).

Qualification

The qualifiers were played between June and October 2016. At the end of the qualification phase, seven teams joined the hosts Gabon.

Player eligibility
Players born 1 January 2000 or later are eligible to participate in the competition.

Qualified teams
Gabon replaced Madagascar due to their selection as the new hosts. Moreover, Tanzania replaced Congo due to a Congolese player failing to turn up for a Magnetic Resonance Imaging test. Mali were cleared to compete after their suspension was lifted by FIFA on 28 April 2017.

Note: All appearance statistics count only those since the introduction of final tournament in 1995.

Venues
The two venues were confirmed in March 2017.

Original venues of Madagascar before hosts were withdrawn.

Draw
The draw for the tournament took place on 24 October 2016, 11:00 local time (UTC+2) at the CAF Headquarters in Cairo.

The teams were seeded based on the results of the last edition (final tournament and qualifiers).

Squads

Each squad can contain a maximum of 21 players.

Match officials
A total of 14 referees and 15 assistant referees were selected for the tournament.

Group stage
The group winners and runners-up advance to the semi-finals and qualify for the 2017 FIFA U-17 World Cup.

Tiebreakers
The teams are ranked according to points (3 points for a win, 1 point for a draw, 0 points for a loss). If tied on points, tiebreakers are applied in the following order:
Number of points obtained in games between the teams concerned;
Goal difference in games between the teams concerned;
Goals scored in games between the teams concerned;
If, after applying criteria 1 to 3 to several teams, two teams still have an equal ranking, criteria 1 to 3 are reapplied exclusively to the matches between the two teams in question to determine their final rankings. If this procedure does not lead to a decision, criteria 5 to 7 apply;
Goal difference in all games;
Goals scored in all games;
Drawing of lots.

All times are local, WAT (UTC+1).

Group A

Group B

Knockout stage
In the knockout stages, if a match is level at the end of normal playing time, kicks from the penalty mark are used to determine the winner (no extra time shall be played).

Bracket

Semi-finals

Third place match

Final

Goalscorers
6 goals

 Djibril Touré

4 goals

 Eric Ayiah

3 goals

 Hadji Dramé

2 goals

 Melo
 Stéphane Zobo
 Ibrahim Sulley
 Emmanuel Toku
 Elhadj Bah
 Lassana N'Diaye
 Ibrahim Marou
 Abdoul Karim Sanda

1 goal

 Gelson
 Tombé
 Fahd Moubeti
 Patmos Arhin
 Aguibou Camara
 Mohamed Camara
 Semé Camara
 Ibrahim Kané
 Mamadou Samaké
 Sofiane Habibou
 Kelvin Naftal
 Abdul Suleiman

Qualified teams for FIFA U-17 World Cup
The following four teams from CAF qualified for the 2017 FIFA U-17 World Cup.

1 Bold indicates champion for that year. Italic indicates host for that year.

References

External links
Total U-17 Africa Cup Of Nations, Gabon 2017, CAFonline.com

 
U-17 Cup of Nations
Africa U-17 Cup of Nations
2017
2017 in Gabonese sport
International association football competitions hosted by Gabon
May 2017 sports events in Africa